Queen of Meth is a 2021 American three part documentary series centering upon Lori Arnold, who was a major methamphetamine dealer in the Midwest. Her meth production and distribution operation was based on a 170 acre ranch in Ottumwa, Iowa, and grossed more than $200,000 per week at its peak. In 1991 she was arrested by the DEA, who seized more than $10 million in assets from her. Convicted of drug trafficking and money laundering, Arnold spent 15 years in prison. Lori is the sister of actor and comedian Tom Arnold.

Episodes

References

External links
 

2020s American television miniseries
Documentary television series about crime in the United States
Television series about illegal drug trade
Drug Enforcement Administration
Television series about organized crime
Methamphetamine
Methamphetamine in the United States